Tom Christensen may refer to:

 Tom Christensen (politician) (born 1966), Canadian politician and lawyer
 Tom Christensen (ice hockey) (born 1944), Norwegian ice hockey player
 Tom Christensen (tennis) (born 1949), Danish tennis player

See also
 Tommy Christensen (born 1961), Danish footballer
 Tom Christiansen (born 1963), American Unix developer
 Thomas Christensen (disambiguation)
 Tom Kristensen (disambiguation)